Llynfi Road is a rugby stadium in Maesteg in Bridgend County Borough, Wales. It is the home of Maesteg RFC.

Club house fire

On 13 August 2013, the club's club house was devastated by fire destroying the Sponsor's Lounge including memorabilia and the electricity. Other areas of the club were also damaged by smoke and water. This was a result of an arson attack. This resulted in there being no annual firework display by Maesteg Round Table on 5 November 2013.

Rugby league

The first senior rugby league match played at Llynfi Road was in 2005 when Bridgend Blue Bulls played Valley Cougars. The game attracted a crowd of around 1,500. The two sides would face each other again in 2010.

Celtic Crusaders took on Keighley Cougars in 2006, winning 58-18. The game had been moved from Brewery Field because of a Bryan Adams concert two days before. Throughout 2009, Celtic Crusaders reserves played 12 games, their under-18s played four times and the under-16s once.

On 8 November 2009 Italy beat Serbia 42-14 and Lebanon beat Ireland 40-16 in a European Cup ranking double header event.

Professional rugby league returned to the Bridgend county borough as South Wales Scorpions moved to Llynfi Road for the 2014 season. This lasted for one season following the Scorpions move to Mountain Ash for the start of the 2015 season.

Greyhound racing
A short lived greyhound track was built around the Old Parish Ground owned by Maesteg Rugby Club. The racing took place before World War II.

References

External links
 Maesteg RFC official site
 South Wales Scorpions official site

Sport in Bridgend County Borough
Maesteg
Rugby league stadiums in Wales
 
Defunct greyhound racing venues in the United Kingdom
Greyhound racing in Wales